Back to the S**t! is a 1989 live album by R&B singer Millie Jackson. It is notable for its cover, which features Jackson sitting on a toilet with a pair of panties down to her ankles, with a strained expression on her face. It is occasionally listed under its uncensored title, Back to the Shit.

Track listing
All tracks composed by Millie Jackson; except where indicated
 "Hot! Wild! Unrestricted! Crazy Love" (Jackson, Timmy Allen)
 "Getting to Know Me"
 "An Imitation of Love" (Jackson, Jonathan Butler, Jolyon Skinner)
 "Love Stinks"
 "Muffle That Fart"
 "I'm Waiting Baby"
 "Will You Love Me Tomorrow" (Carole King, Gerry Goffin)
 "Investigative Reporting"
 "Love is a Dangerous Game" (Billy Ocean, Jonathan Butler, Wayne Brathwaite, Jolyon Skinner)
 "Sho Nuff Danjus"

References

1989 live albums
Millie Jackson albums
Jive Records live albums